Anil Sunkara is an Indian film producer, writer, and director who works in Telugu film industry. He is popularly known for producing award-winning movie Dookudu.Ajay Sunkara, his brother is a Co-producer for most of his movies.
Anil Sunkara has produced Telugu movies named Namo Venkatesa, 1: Nenokkadine, Legend, Aagadu, Krishna Gaadi Veera Prema Gaadha, Hyper, LIE under 14 Reels Entertainment Banner and Bindaas, Aha Naa Pellanta, Action 3D, James Bond, Run, Eedo Rakam Aado Rakam, Eedu Gold Ehe, Kittu Unnadu Jagratha, Andhhagadu, Kirrak Party, Rajugadu, Sita, Chanakya under AK Entertainments Banner. In 2013, he directed the movie Action 3D. Upcoming Projects Includes Mahasamudram and a Bio-Pic of APJ Abdul Kalam . He is also the CEO of Advansoft International Inc.

Filmography

As Producer

As director
Action 3D (2013)

Awards
 CineMAA Awards in Best Film category for the film in Dookudu(2011) 2012.
 Filmfare Award for Best Film – Telugu  for the film Dookudu(2011) in 2012.
 SIIMA Award for Best Film - Telugu  for the film Dookudu(2011) in 2012.
 Times of India Film Awards in the Best Film category for the film Dookudu(2011) in 2012.
 Nandi Award for Best Popular Feature Film for the film Dookudu(2011) in 2013.
 National Film Award for Best Feature Film in Telugu for the film Chandamama Kathalu(2014) in 2015

See also

Tollywood
SIIMA Award for Best Film
Filmfare Award for Best Film – Telugu
National Film Award for Best Feature Film in Telugu

References

External links
 

Telugu film producers
Living people
Year of birth missing (living people)